Platte Canyon High School, located in Bailey, Colorado, United States, was founded in 1957. The school building is located on Highway 285 in Park County.

Athletics
Platte Canyon High School is a member of the Colorado High School Activities Association (CHSAA) and the Frontier League. The Platte Canyon Huskies participate in 2A football (Colorado Conference) and 3A Frontier League basketball, baseball, cheer, cross country, speech and debate, softball, track & field, volleyball, wrestling, along with 4A Inter-League girls' swimming and 5A State League alpine skiing.

2006 hostage crisis

On September 27, 2006, a "hostage situation" was reported at 11:40 a.m. local time (1740 UTC) at the high school. Duane R. Morrison, 53, of Denver, reportedly said that he had a bomb. He had taken six students as hostages in a second-floor room and released four of them while keeping the other two; each of the six hostages was female.
Once SWAT members approached, one of the female hostages, identified as 16-year-old Emily Keyes, was shot and critically wounded. She was taken away by a helicopter, and was later declared dead from her injuries. The hostage-taker then shot and killed himself. The other female was not wounded.

References

External links
 

Educational institutions established in 1957
Schools in Park County, Colorado
Public high schools in Colorado
1957 establishments in Colorado